There have been several Portuguese civil wars.
1383–85 Portuguese crisis
Battle of Alfarrobeira (1449)
War of the Portuguese Succession (1580–83)
Liberal Wars (1828–34)
Patuleia (1846–47)
Monarchy of the North (1919)